Jorma Kaukonen's Fur Peace Ranch is located in Meigs County, Ohio, United States, near Pomeroy. The 126-acre ranch hosts weekend workshops for guitarists. Among the distinguished staff members are Larry Campbell, Warren Haynes, and Tommy Emmanuel. Concerts from the ranch are released on the radio show Live From Jorma Kaukonen's Fur Peace Ranch, on WOUB and PRX stations.

References

External links 
 FurPeaceRanch.com

Concert halls in Ohio
Performing arts centers in Ohio
Buildings and structures in Meigs County, Ohio